Gibala may refer to :

 Places
 Gibała, a village in Warmian-Masurian Voivodeship, Poland
 Tell Tweini, an archaeological site in Syria

 People
 Miloš Gibala (born 1985), Slovak footballer
 Roman Gibala (born 1972), Czech footballer
 Ronald Gibala, American engineer
 Other
 Gibala regimen

See also